The following highways are numbered 856:

United States